John Stratford (c.1572–c.1634), of the Noble House of Stratford, was an Elizabethan and Jacobean merchant and entrepreneur, and a significant grower of tobacco in the Cotswolds.

Life
John Stratford, son of Edward Stratford of Winchcombe and his first wife Dorothy was baptised in Winchcombe, Gloucestershire in 1572. He became a London salter apprenticed to Peter Robinson, marrying his daughter Joan at Cheshunt, Hertfordshire on 20 April 1602. They had two sons and five daughters, all born between 1603 and 1615 and baptized at St Matthew's Church, Friday Street, London. He had previously been thought to be a son of John Stratford and Margaret Tracy.

Work
Stratford traded first in Cheshire cheese and woollen hose from the country, but then switched to rough flax, linen yarn, wheat, and rye, bought from Baltic merchants in exchange for English broadcloth. He entered into partnership with John Hopkins, a fellow apprentice, who also married one of Robinson's daughters. When, through a second marriage, Hopkins became a kinsman of one Vickares, a woollen draper, Hopkins took over the broadcloth trade and Stratford concentrated on the flax trade, in partnership with three others, his half-brother Ralph, Thomas Lane, married to a third daughter of Robinson, and Humphrey Thornbury. They prospered and employed many poor in and near London to dress flax, until the Dutch brought in dressed flax and business diminished.

Stratford returned to his Prescott estate in Gloucestershire and began to grow tobacco, raising some capital from Abraham Burrell, but Henry Somerscales as his main partner (Somerscales had learned in the Netherlands how to cultivate tobacco, and took responsibility for the sale of the matured crop). At the same time Stratford was engaged with his half-brother Ralph in soap-boiling in London, and dealt in tallow, potash, soap-ash, and oil. An appeal to the privy council in 1623 prompted their recommendation that his creditors forbear, for one year, later extended, to press for payment. He also experimented with linen manufacture. He urged the growing of flax and hemp as a state policy, and more ploughing of pasture to make work.

Death
The date and place of his death are unknown; a lawsuit implies that Stratford was still living in 1634, but he predeceased his wife, whose will was proved on 1 May 1654. The administration of the estate of a John Stratford of Monmouth was granted to his wife Joan in 1638.

Sources
 Joan Thirsk, ‘Stratford, John (b. 1582?, d. in or after 1634)’, rev. Oxford Dictionary of National Biography, Oxford University Press, 2004; online edn, Jan 2008 accessed 1 June 2014
 Stratford, Gerald "Tobacco Growing in the Vale of Evesham, Winchcombe and District, and John Stratford"

External links
  Essay on "Tobacco Growing in the Vale of Evesham, Winchcombe and District, and John Stratford" by Gerald Stratford

John
1580s births
Businesspeople in the tobacco industry
17th-century English people
Year of death uncertain
1630s deaths